Zantzinger, Borie and Medary was an American architecture firm that operated from 1905 to 1950 in Philadelphia. It specialized in institutional and civic projects. For most of its existence, the partners were Clarence C. Zantzinger, Charles Louis Borie Jr. and Milton Bennett Medary, all Philadelphians.

The firm was a launching pad for numerous architects of note, including Dominique Berninger (1898–1949) and Louis Kahn (1901–1974).

Zantzinger & Borie
The firm was established in 1905 as Zantzinger & Borie. Zantzinger and Borie were involved in years of preliminary design work on the Philadelphia Museum of Art. The 1911 commission was shared between Z&B and Horace Trumbauer. Most of the credit for the final building, completed in 1928, is given to architects Howell Lewis Shay and Julian Abele, both from Trumbauer's firm.

After Medary joined in 1910, the firm was renamed Zantzinger, Borie & Medary.

Zantzinger, Borie & Medary
The firm collaborated with Paul Philippe Cret for the completed buildings listed below, and on proposals for the Nebraska State Capitol and the Liberty Memorial in Kansas City. When Medary died in 1929, the firm returned to its original name. Their work was part of the architecture event in the art competition at the 1928 Summer Olympics.

The firm was the first recorded American employer of French-born American architect Dominique Berninger, who worked there from 1925 to 1932. During this time he served as job captain for their design project of the Sheffield Scientific School at Yale University, New Haven, Connecticut, a project that cost around $1,250,000. Louis Kahn and Berninger had met while working at the firm and went on to form the Architectural Research Group (ARG) in Philadelphia, a short-lived collaborative society from 1932 to 1935 before Kahn took a job with the Philadelphia City Planning Commission, while Berninger commenced his own practice in 1933 and later formed the partnership of Berninger & Bower (fl.1935 – 1945), the predecessor firm of Haag & d'Entremont (fl.1946 – 1988).

The firm employed Edmund R. Purves as a draftsman from 1923 to 1927.  The firm also worked with sculptor Lee Lawrie and iconographer Hartley Burr Alexander, both former collaborators with Bertram Goodhue.

The firm dissolved in 1950.

Selected works
1905: West Philadelphia Branch, Free Library of Philadelphia, 40th & Walnut Streets, Philadelphia, Pennsylvania
1909: Henry Charles Lea Monument, Laurel Hill Cemetery, Philadelphia, Pennsylvania, Alexander Stirling Calder, sculptor.
1912: "Chanticleer" (Adolph Rosengarten Estate), Wayne, Pennsylvania. Now a public garden.
1916: Indianapolis Central Public Library, Indianapolis, with Paul Philippe Cret.
1917: Washington Memorial Chapel, Valley Forge National Historical Park, Valley Forge, Pennsylvania.
1918: Federal Ordnance Plant Housing, Neville Island, Ohio River, Pennsylvania. The $50,000,000 commission was for 15,000 homes to house 20-25,000 workers.
1921-24: Henry Hall and Foulke Hall, Princeton University, Princeton, New Jersey.
1926-27: Fidelity Mutual Life Insurance Company Building, Philadelphia. Now part of the Philadelphia Museum of Art.
1927-28: Detroit Institute of Arts, Detroit, with Paul Philippe Cret.
1927-29: Bok Singing Tower, Lake Wales, Florida.
1929-31: Burton-Judson Courts, Hyde Park, Chicago.
1931: Strathcona Hall, Yale University, New Haven, Connecticut. This probably refers to the Sheffield Scientific School at Yale, a project that cost around $1,250,000, on which Berninger served as job captain.
1932-35: Department of Justice Building, Washington, D.C., (on which Kahn worked).

See also

 List of Art Deco architecture

Gallery

References

External links
 brief history of ZBM at Philadelphia Architects and Buildings
 brief history of Z&B at Philadelphia Architects and Buildings
 history of the Department of Justice building

Defunct architecture firms based in Pennsylvania
Architecture firms based in Pennsylvania
Companies based in Philadelphia
Art Deco architects
Olympic competitors in art competitions